"A Lot" (stylized in lowercase) is a song by Atlanta-based rapper 21 Savage. The audio of the song was released on December 20, 2018 via the rapper's YouTube account. It was sent to rhythmic and urban contemporary radio on January 8, 2019 as the lead single from his second studio album I Am > I Was.

"A Lot" features North Carolina rapper J. Cole, though he only appears in the streaming and digital versions, as well as later CD pressings. The song was written by the artists and its producers DJ Dahi and J. White Did It. It samples "I Love You" by East of Underground, which is a cover of "I Love You for All Seasons" performed by The Fuzz; The Fuzz member Shelia Young is credited as a co-writer. The song received acclaim from critics, with Billboard ranking it as the 6th best song of 2019. It won a Grammy Award for Best Rap Song at the 2020 ceremony, marking both 21 Savage and J. Cole's first Grammy wins.

Background 
Speaking to The Breakfast Club radio show, 21 Savage recalled how the song came about after he and J. Cole first met at the Made in America Festival in 2018; the two exchanged cellphone numbers and a random text from Cole ended up in a studio session.

21 further elaborated:He took the song with him back home to Raleigh, 'cause he drove [...] and then he sent me the shit. And I was like, "Damn, this shit hard as fuck". That was just like some spur-of-the-moment shit. You know I had to go up there and fuck with Cole".

Composition and lyrics
On the song, 21 Savage reflects "just how much he's endured and how far he's come". J. Cole meanwhile "speaks directly on the dubious machinations of the music industry, the justice system, media spin and his own place in the larger narrative". The lyricism was described by Billboard as "heady, honest lyricism that gives the song its timeless appeal". The song's video and the original CD edition feature an additional verse by 21, which included the line "Been through some things, but I couldn't imagine my kids stuck at the border", a reference to the Trump administration family separation policy. The hook contains similarities to Gucci Mane's 2009 song of the same name.

Music video
The music video was released on February 1, 2019 and was directed by filmmaker Aisultan Seitov. It depicts 21 Savage having a family reunion in a luxurious mansion, with alternate shots intercut of his family members in dire situations such as being pulled over by police, in the hospital, refining cocaine, in jail, held hostage by organized crime, being sexually trafficked, or mourning the death of a son. The video was influenced by the films Cold War and The Godfather Part II.

Both J. Cole's verse and 21 Savage's alternate verse from the album version are featured, with J. Cole also appearing in the video.

Alleged correlation to the detention of 21 Savage
After the arrest and detention of 21 Savage by ICE just days after the release of the music video for "A Lot", it was purported that besides his immigration status, the rapper was specifically targeted due to his alternate verse for the album version of the song. Lawyers for 21 Savage, in addition to U.S. Representative Alexandria Ocasio-Cortez, all suspect that ICE targeted him for a certain stanza of the song that criticized issues with the Mexico-U.S. border, especially the Trump administration family separation policy.

Charts

Weekly charts

Year-end charts

Certifications

Awards

External links

References

2018 songs 
2019 singles
21 Savage songs
Epic Records singles
Song recordings produced by J. White Did It
Songs written by 21 Savage
Songs written by J. White Did It
Songs written by DJ Dahi
Immigration-related protests
Songs written by J. Cole
Song recordings produced by DJ Dahi